Ephraim Monsell (1725 - 1798) was an Irish Anglican priest.

Monsell was born in Limerick and educated at Trinity College, Dublin. He was appointed  Archdeacon of Elphin in 1782 and held the post until his death.

References 

Archdeacons of Elphin
Alumni of Trinity College Dublin
Clergy from Limerick (city)
18th-century Irish Anglican priests
1798 deaths
1725 births